The Boletobiinae are a subfamily of moths in the family Erebidae, containing about 956 species. The taxon was described by Achille Guenée in 1858.

Taxonomy
Phylogenetic analysis has determined that several subfamilies of the family Erebidae that have been proposed in entomological literature since 2005, including Araeopteroninae, Aventiinae, Boletobiinae, Eublemminae, and Phytometrinae, together form a strongly supported clade as an aggregated subfamily Boletobiinae.  The tribe-level groupings of genera within this expanded subfamily Boletobiinae are a topic of continued study.

Genera

Abacena
Acremma
Aglaonice
Allerastria
Araeopteron
Autoba
Bandelia
Calymma
Cecharismena
Cerynea
Condate
Corgatha
Enispa
Enispodes
Euaontia
Eublemma
Eublemmoides
Glympis
Hemeroplanis
Hiccoda
Homocerynea
Homodes
Honeyania
Hormoschista
Hypenagonia
Hypersophtha
Hyperstrotia
Hyposada
Isogona
Janseodes
Laspeyria
Lopharthrum
Mataeomera
Metachrostis
Metaemene
Metalectra
Micraeschus
Mursa
Mycterophora
Nychioptera
Odice
Ommatochila
Oruza
Parascotia
Parolulis
Phytometra
Prolophota
Proroblemma
Prosoparia
Pseudcraspedia
Raparna
Rhypagla
Sophta
Spargaloma
Tamba
Taraconica
Trisateles
Zurobata

References

 
Moth subfamilies